The Pipestone River is a river in northwestern Ontario, Canada. It is a major tributary of Winisk River via Wunnummin Lake. This pristine river flows through rugged wilderness of Ontario's northern boreal forest, and drains into Wunnummin Lake.

The river has extensive whitewater sections, including 37 sets of rapids ranging from Class 1 to 5+. The portion of the river from Nord Road (formerly Highway 808) to its mouth is protected in the Pipestone River Provincial Park. Because of its remoteness and lack of facilities and services, canoeists require well-skilled wilderness and whitewater experience.

At Misamikwash Lake (formerly known as Big Beaver Lake), the Hudson's Bay Company operated a fur trading post and outpost called Big Beaver House, that operated from 1911 to 1965. It was established by William King Oman as an outpost in 1911 and became a full trading post in 1945. In 1948, a store and warehouse were built. It closed in 1965 and moved its business to Wunnummin Lake.

Geography
Significant tributaries of the Pipestone River are (in upstream order):
 Wachusk River
 Paseminon River
 Morris River
 North Pipestone River

Significant lakes along its course include (in upstream order):
 Hilyard Lake
 Misamikwash Lake
 Horseshoe Lake
 Kecheokagan Lake

References

Rivers of Kenora District